Irugu Porugu is a 1963 Indian Telugu-language comedy film directed by I. N. Murthy and produced by Chilamkurthi Vijaya Saradhi. The film stars N. T. Rama Rao and Krishna Kumari. A remake of the Bengali film Ami Baro Hobo (1957), it was released on 11 January 1963.

Plot 
Vishwanatham, a poor writer, lives along with his two kids Johnny and Jikki. He is also addicted to horse races which he wins once when his friend misleads by taking him to a dancer Kanchanamala. Viswanatham looks at her as his daughter, she too gets impressed by his words and changes her lifestyle. In return, the drunken Vishwanatham meets with an accident and is hospitalised when his infants move in search of their father and get separated. After reaching home, Viswanatham also rushes to find the children, becomes mad and he has been sentenced for the crime of abducting children.

Parallelly, Jikki is adopted by a couple Paramdamayya and his wife Saraswathi, and grows up as Chitra. Johnny is raised by a motor workshop owner Sundaram by the name Ramu (M. Balayya). Years roll by, Vinod Babu, the house owner of Paramdamayya leads a happy family life with his wife Charulatha and son Ravi.

After some petty quarrels, Ravi and Chitra fall in love and Ramu loves Jayanthi, daughter of Sundaram. Being aware of it, Sundaram necks out Ramu and fixes Jayanthi's alliance with his sister's son Dr. Prasad. Meanwhile, Viswanatham releases, Kanchanamala who is running a drama company at present takes him and plans a drama under his direction. Ramu also joins their company and recognises his father. Meanwhile, Vinod Babu senses the love affair of Ravi and Chitra and warns Paramdamayya when Saraswathi scolds Chitra for remembering herself as an orphan. Depressed, Chitra leaves the house and falls under the care of Ramu who gives her shelter and asks her to participate in their drama.

On the other side, Paramdamayya becomes furious about Saraswathi's deed, in that quarrel, unfortunately, she dies falling from the terrace. Due to this Paramdamayya becomes mad and goes on wandering. Eventually, Ravi learns the truth from his mother and makes his father realise his mistake. Simultaneously, Prasad also convinces Sundaram for the match between Ramu and Jayanthi. At the same time, Chitra recollects her father and brother in the drama. At last, everyone reunites in one place including Paramdamayya. Finally, the movie ends on a happy note with the marriages of Ravi with Chitra, and Ramu with Jayanthi.

Cast 
N. T. Rama Rao as Ravi
Krishna Kumari as Chitra / Jikki
Relangi as Vinod Babu
Gummadi as Viswanatham
V. Nagayya as Sundaram
M. Balayya as Ramu / Johnny
C. S. R. as Parandhamayya
Mikkilineni
Sobhan Babu as Prasad
Allu Ramalingaiah
Balakrishna as Anji
Sowcar Janaki as Kanchala Mala
Sandhya as Charulatha
Girija as Jayanthi
E. V. Saroja as Dancer
L. Vijayalakshmi as Dancer
Nirmalamma as Saraswathi

Music 
The music was composed by Master Venu.

Release and reception 
Irugu Porugu premiered on 5 January 1963 at Vijaya Gardens, Madras for press and film industry people. It was dedicated to Bellary Raghava, a legend of Telugu theatre. The film was released on 11 January 1963. D. K. M. of Andhra Patrika reviewed the film positively commending the writing, direction, music, and the performances of the cast especially C. S. R. Anjaneyulu. Venkat Rao of Andhra Jyothi called Irugu Porugu an entertaining film and noted C. S. R. Anjaneyulu's performance as the highlight of the film and as his career best. He also praised the dialogues of Kondepudi and the direction of I. N. Murthy.

References

External links 
 

1960s Telugu-language films
1963 comedy films
Films scored by Master Venu
Indian comedy films
Telugu remakes of Bengali films